Sawran Subdistrict is a subdistrict of Azaz District in northwestern Aleppo Governorate of northern Syria, on the border with Turkey. The administrative centre is the town of Sawran. Neighbouring subdistricts are Azaz Subdistrict to the west, Akhtarin to the east and Mare' to the south. To the north is the Kilis Province of Turkey.

At the 2004 census, the subdistrict had a population of 30,032.

Cities, towns and villages

References 

Azaz District
Sawran